György P. Bulányi (Budapest, 9 January 1919 – Budapest, June 6, 2010) was a Piarist priest, teacher, and leader of the Bokor Catholic youth discipleship movements in Croatia and Hungary which faced strong suppression from the Hungarian communist government and Catholic hierarchy for their advocacy of conscientious objection.

Early life 

Bulányi graduated from the College of Teacher Education, the College of Paleontology, and then the Pázmány Péter University of Sciences. In 1943 he was ordained a priest in the Piarist Order. He then taught in a Piarist high school serving Sátoraljaújhely, Tata, and Debrecen.
In March 1945, a Croatian Jesuit named Kolakovićs came to Hungary to form base communities of youth with the permission of József Mindszenty, bishop of Veszprém.  Kolakovićs viewed the model of base communities or cell groups as a survival strategy in the face of likely communist suppression where leaders might be unavailable. Bulányi and Kolakovićs collaborated to in the formation of the high school students who joined this community, and the group came to be called Bokor meaning "bush". They were sometimes also called Bulányists.

Bokor 

Bokor was focused on following Jesus and cultivating a love for Jesus. Bokor taught principles of altruism, humility, voluntary poverty, service to the poor, and Christian pacifism. Bokor opposed all involvement in the military and use of force. It was a movement designed for exponential growth, intending to train participants to start their own leaderless cell group of 4–12 friends. The movement was egalitarian, offering all participants the opportunity to share their opinions, and group prayers were performed by taking turns.

In 1949, Bulányi wrote a pamphlet  (Old Scripture) on behalf of a group calling itself  (Bush-Eco). The pamphlet asserted that humanity has a moral responsibility to respect nature, preserve the natural environment, and consider the impacts of actions on future generations. This is one of the earliest documents of the modern environmental movement in Hungary.

Bokor opposed the atheist communist ideology of the Hungarian state under Mátyás Rákosi, and continued to clash specifically on the topic of pacifism. The Hungarian State Church Office to the Bishop warned them that this position would not be tolerated, but Bokor held firm on this issue. The Hungarian government viewed the Bokor community as an illegal anti-state organization, and sentenced Bulányi to life imprisonment in 1952. He escaped in October 1956 during the Hungarian revolution and became a parish priest in downtown Budapest. However, he was arrested again in April 1958 and later released again in 1960. At this time, he was one of the most controversial figures in Hungarian Catholicism. He then worked as an unskilled laborer while he wrote a book, Seek the kingdom of God!

Bokor grew throughout the 1960s and became even more visible after 1970, despite ongoing suppression from both the government and the Catholic hierarchy. For those interested in deeper discipleship, Bokor offered a 5 year theological course involving about 78–80 spiritual exercises per year.
In 1989, Bokor had 185 leaders, 35 of whom were priests. The movement was connected to the base communities of Latin American liberation theology. Bokor continued to be suppressed by the Hungarian government until 1990.

Conscientious objection advocacy 

From the end of the 1970s into 1981, Bulányi became more vocal in preaching pacifism and conscientious objection publicly, and the practice increased markedly. Dozens of Bokor members were imprisoned for their pacifist stance. Hungarian Catholic officials, led by László Paskai, archbishop of Esztergom-Budapest, strongly objected to Bulányi's teaching, considering it harmful and dangerous. They issued a formal condemnation of conscientious objection in October 1986. These officials supported government suppression of conscientious objectors, and imprisonments continued throughout the 1980s. Continued advocacy from groups like Bokor and interaction with Catholics outside of Hungary softened their perspective, however, and in March 1988, Paskai suggested that the Prime Minister allow alternative civilian service. Paskai later claimed to have been constrained by the autocratic government and said that he had no choice but to collaborate in suppression.

Conflict with Catholic hierarchy 

The Hungarian government and Catholic hierarchy responded by seeking to discredit Bulányi by presenting evidence that his writings were heretical. There was significant debate about Bulányi's writings such as Church order and Is obedience a virtue?, drawing input from theologians such as Hans Küng. In a 31 December 1986 letter, Cardinal Joseph Ratzinger, head of the Congregation for the Doctrine of the Faith, asked Bulányi to publicly withdraw his teachings on the universal priesthood of the laity as false, dangerous ambiguous, and heretical. Bulányi did not agree with Ratzinger's assessment, and for a decade these strong official statements against Bulányi remained. After the change in government in Hungary in 1989, the Hungarian state requested forgiveness from Bulányi. However, leaders of the Catholic Church did not apologize.

Finally, in February 1997, Bulányi and Ratzinger came to an agreement, with John Paul II offering greater freedom of conscience than Ratzinger had previously accepted. Bulányi cooperated, clarified his teachings, and signed a statement requested of him. On 5 April 1997, Ratzinger wrote that he considered the matter closed. On 10 September 1997, there was a public announcement of the formal rehabilitation of Bulányi in the Catholic Church, and he was once again permitted to conduct mass.

The Hungarian Catholic Bishops' Conference published the statements of Bulányi and Ratzinger without comment. Some Hungarian Catholics were disappointed that the Conference didn't offer an apology for their behavior toward Bulányi and his supporters. These Catholic viewed the actions of the Catholic hierarchy as improper use of power in collaboration with an immoral autocratic state. Even after rehabilitation, Bulányi continued to be marginalized within the Catholic community.

Views 
Bulányi identified with the views of Marcion of Sinope in rejecting the Old Testament as uninspired, immoral, and incompatible with the character of the God of Jesus who is love.

Bulányi affirmed a church structure consisting of base communities, based on a theological affirmation of universal priesthood of the laity.

Works 

 
 
 
 
 
 It was laid in Jászol. Christmas meditations by György Bulányi, 1949–1993 ; Irotron, Bp., 1993
 
 
 
 
 
 
 
 
 
  (six-volumes)
 Seek the Kingdom of God! Where did it come from?
 Seek the Kingdom of God! Why did you come?
 Seek the Kingdom of God! The road
 Seek the Kingdom of God! Not accepted in
 Seek the Kingdom of God! The country
 
 
 György Bulányi's presentation on the secret state preparation of the bishop's judgment against him

See also 
 Béla Hamvas
 Katolikus Ifjúsági Mozgalom
 László Lukács
 Regnum Marianum Community
 Sándor Sík

Citations

References

Further reading 

 
 
 
 
 
 
 
 
 Bulányi Two evaluations of Buljan rehabilitation
 
 
 Csiszer, Monika (2009) Towards a new vision of the laity and their mission : an exploration of the response of the Roman Catholic Church in Hungary to the Vatican II documents, University of South Africa, Pretoria hdl=10500/2493
 
 
 
 
 
 
 
 
 
 
 
 
 
 
 
 
 
 
 
  PDF

External links 
 György Bulányi 
 Bokor 
 BOCS Foundation 
 Ferenc Faragó  

1919 births
2010 deaths
20th-century Hungarian educators
Catholic pacifists
Late Modern Christian anti-Judaism
Conscientious objectors
Dissident Roman Catholic theologians
Escapees from Hungarian detention
20th-century Hungarian Roman Catholic priests
Hungarian Roman Catholic theologians
Hungarian anti-communists
Hungarian environmentalists
Hungarian escapees
Hungarian prisoners sentenced to life imprisonment
Piarists
Prisoners sentenced to life imprisonment by Hungary
Roman Catholic religious educators
Clergy from Budapest